Jan Martel is the name of:
Jan Martel (sculptor) (1896–1966), French sculptor
Jan Martel (bridge) American bridge player